John Haakon Johnsen (January 5, 1892 – August 24, 1984) was a Norwegian freestyle and backstroke swimmer who competed in the 1912 Summer Olympics. He was born and died in Oslo, and his club was Oslo IL.

In the 1912 Olympic Games, he was eliminated in the semi-finals of the 400 metre freestyle event. He also participated in the 100 metre freestyle competition, in the 1500 metre freestyle event, and in the 100 metre backstroke competition but was eliminated in all three contests in the first round.

References

External links
profile

1892 births
1984 deaths
Sportspeople from Oslo
Norwegian male freestyle swimmers
Norwegian male backstroke swimmers
Olympic swimmers of Norway
Swimmers at the 1912 Summer Olympics
20th-century Norwegian people